Elisabeth Brandau (born 16 December 1985) is a German female Mountain Bike and cyclo-cross cyclist. She represented her nation in the women's elite event at the 2016 UCI Cyclo-cross World Championships  in Heusden-Zolder.

She was on the start list of 2018 Cross-Country European Championships and finished 5..

References

External links

1985 births
Living people
Cyclo-cross cyclists
German female cyclists
Place of birth missing (living people)
German mountain bikers
Cyclists at the 2020 Summer Olympics
Olympic cyclists of Germany
21st-century German women